Yūichi Sugita won the title, defeating Stéphane Robert in the final 6–2, 1–6, 6–3.

Seeds

Draw

Finals

Top half

Bottom half

References
 Main Draw
 Qualifying Draw

Men's Singles
Hua Hin Championships - Singles
 in Thai tennis